Lontara Bilang-bilang is a cipher of the Lontara script, currently used for Buginese poetry. This script uses the Eastern Arabic numerals-inspired letterform to substitute the Lontara script, as a way to hide it to the Dutch at the time. It was an adaptation to a similar ciphers of the Arabic script that has been used in South Asia around the 19th century.

Usage 
In Buginese literature, Lontara Bilang-bilang is sometimes used as a substitute to Lontara script in writing basa to bakke', a play-on-words, as well as élong maliung bettuanna, poetry with some hidden meaning using basa to bakke'. In this script, each base letter in standard Lontara are substituted with forms derived from Arabic script and its numerals, with standard, unchanged Lontara vowel diacritics attached to them.

Cipher system 
Lontara Bilang-Bilang substitutes Arabic letters with stylized numerals in accordance with Abjad numerals, a system that has been used in 19 AD in what is now Pakistan and Afghanistan. In Bilang-Bilang,  many letters for Arabic sounds not in Buginese are not used, while for sounds existing in Buginese and Malay, new letters are added with more stylization. For example, ب have a numeral value of 2 and therefore is substituted by a stylized form of ٢, illustrated as follows:

Jawi letters for Malay and Buginese sounds are formed with dots as equivalent for its Arabic counterpart. For example. ج (jim) uses the form of ٣, while چ (ca) uses the form of ٣ as well but with the addition of three dots, illustrated as follows:

Pre-nasal sounds are formed with the addition of a diacritic line, illustrated as follows:

Letterform Table

Unicode 
The Lontara Bilang-bilang Script has not yet been added into the Unicode standard as of version 14.0. A code range has been assigned for it in the Supplementary Multilingual Plane, but as of revision 14.0.0, no proposals has been made for assigning the letters.

Example text

See also 
 Buginese language
 Lontara script
 Cipher

References 

Brahmic scripts
Indonesian scripts